Robert Llewellyn Bradshaw (16 September 1916 – 23 May 1978) was the first Premier of Saint Kitts and Nevis, and previously served as Chief Minister, legislator, and labour activist.

Early life 

Bradshaw was born in the Saint Paul Capisterre Village in Saint Kitts to Mary Jane Francis, a domestic servant, and William Bradshaw, a blacksmith. He was raised by his grandmother after his father moved to the United States when Bradshaw was nine months old. He attended St. Paul's Primary School and completed seventh grade, the highest level of primary education available in Saint Kitts at the time.

At 16, Bradshaw became a machine apprentice at the St. Kitts Sugar Factory, where he began to take interest in the labour movement. In 1940, he left the sugar factory following a strike for higher wages and joined the St. Kitts and Nevis Trades and Labour Union as a clerk. Bradshaw succeeded Joseph Matthew Sebastian as president of the union in 1944.

In 1963 he married, Mildred Sahaley, a Kittitian-Lebanese. They had one daughter, Isis Carla Bradshaw, together. His first daughter, Etsu, is from an earlier relationship.

Political career
Bradshaw supported the cause of the sugar workers and was one of the political stalwarts of the country. In 1945 he became president of the recently created St Kitts-Nevis-Anguilla Labour Party.  He entered politics in 1946 and won a seat in the Legislative Council in the elections that year, later becoming a member of the Executive Council.  In 1956 he was Minister of Trade and Production for St. Kitts-Nevis-Anguilla.  During the short-lived West Indies Federation (from 1958 to 1962), Bradshaw was elected to the Federal House of Representatives and held the post of minister of finance for the West Indies Federation.

After the break-up of the Federation, Bradshaw returned to St. Kitts from Trinidad.  In 1966 he became Chief Minister, and in 1967 the first Premier of St. Kitts-Nevis-Anguilla, then an associated state of the United Kingdom.  Under his leadership, all sugar lands, as well as the central sugar factory, were bought by the government. Opposition to Bradshaw's rule began to build. Opposition was especially great in Nevis, where it was felt that the island was being neglected and unfairly deprived of revenue, investment and services by its larger neighbour. Bradshaw mainly ignored Nevis' complaints, but Nevisian disenchantment with the Labour Party proved a key factor in the party's eventual fall from power. Opposition in Anguilla was even stronger, with the Anguillans evicting St. Kitts police from their island and holding referendums in 1967 and 1969, both times voting overwhelmingly to secede from St. Kitts-Nevis and remain a separate British territory.

In 1977 Bradshaw travelled to London for talks on independence with the British government.

Death
Bradshaw died on 23 May 1978 of prostate cancer at his home in Basseterre. He was succeeded by his Deputy Premier, Paul Southwell. He is buried in Springfield cemetery in Basseterre.

Legacy
In 1996, Bradshaw was posthumously awarded the title of First National Hero by the National Assembly of Saint Kitts and Nevis and is honoured annually on National Heroes Day, which is observed on his birthday. On the inaugural National Heroes Day in 1998, the Golden Rock Airport in Saint Kitts was renamed the Robert L. Bradshaw International Airport in his honor. In 2007, the Robert Llewellyn Bradshaw Memorial Park was dedicated at his birthplace in St. Paul's. On 17 September 2010, the Robert Llewellyn Bradshaw building was dedicated on the Windsor University School of Medicine campus in Cayon.

References

Further reading

Alexander, R. J. and Eldon Parker (2004). A History of Organized Labor in the English-Speaking West Indies. Westport, CT: Praeger.
Brown, Margaret and W. R. Louis (2001). The Oxford History of the British Empire. Oxford: Oxford University Press.
Burks, Edward (1967). "New Caribbean State Beset by Poverty and Revolt." New York Times. June 29.
Hurwitz, Samuel (1966). "The Federation of the West Indies: A Study in Nationalism." Journal of British Studies 6.
Knight, F. W. and Colin Palmer (1986). The Modern Caribbean. Chapel Hill, NC: University of North Carolina Press.
(1978). "Robert Bradshaw Dies: Premier in Caribbean." The Washington Post. May 25.
Thorndike, Tony (1989). "The Future of the British Caribbean Dependencies." Journal of Interamerican Affairs and World Studies 31.

1916 births
1978 deaths
Prime Ministers of Saint Kitts and Nevis
Labour ministers of Saint Kitts and Nevis
Trade ministers of Saint Kitts and Nevis
Recipients of the Order of the National Hero (Saint Kitts and Nevis)
Saint Kitts and Nevis trade unionists
Saint Kitts and Nevis Labour Party politicians
Deaths from cancer in Saint Kitts and Nevis
Deaths from prostate cancer
British Leeward Islands people of World War II
People from Saint Paul Capisterre Parish
National Heroes of Saint Kitts and Nevis
Members of the Federal Parliament of the West Indies Federation